"Beware of the Dog" is a song by English singer Jamelia. It was written by Jamelia, Stuart Crichton, Tommy Lee James, and Karen Poole for her third studio album Walk with Me (2006), while production was helmed by Crichton. The song is built around a sample of Depeche Mode's song "Personal Jesus" (1989), written by Martin Gore. "Beware of the Dog" was selected and released as the second single from Walk with Me in December 2006.

The song peaked at number 10 on the UK Singles Chart. In July 2007, "Beware of the Dog" was shortlisted for the Popjustice £20 Music Prize, a prize which recognizes the best British pop single over the past year. In support of the song, Jamelia performed the track with UK rock band Feeder, at their gig that was held on 9 November 2006 gig at the London Coronet. "Beware of the Dog" has also been used in the advertisement for UK television network's Channel 4 show, Goldplated. The song was also used as one of the catwalk tracks for the 2006 Victoria's Secret Fashion Show.

Chart performance
"Beware of the Dog" became Jamelia's second single to enter the UK top forty, based on downloads alone. It also received high radio airplay, reaching BBC Radio 1's A-list and peaking inside the top twenty of both British television airplay and radio airplay charts. Upon its physical release, "Beware of the Dog" peaked at number ten in its second week on the UK Singles Chart, becoming her seventh UK top ten single. In Australia, "Beware of the Dog" debuted at number fifty-one on 21 May 2007, due to low digital downloads but on its second week it moved up to its peak position of fifty.

Music video
Shot in a black-and-white format, the music video for "Beware of the Dog" was filmed by Norwegian director Ray Kay. It premiered in the United Kingdom on 21 October 2006. Set in central London, it features Jamelia being driven at high speed through Soho before arriving at a nightclub and performing to a crowd. Big Brother UK Series 8 housemate Nabeel "Billi" Bhatti starred in the video.

Track listings

Charts

Weekly charts

Year-end charts

Release history

References

2006 singles
Jamelia songs
Songs written by Karen Poole
Songs written by Martin Gore
2006 songs
Parlophone singles
Songs written by Tommy Lee James
Songs written by Stuart Crichton
Songs written by Jamelia